The European Maritime Force (EUROMARFOR or EMF) is a non-standing, military force with the current participation of France, Italy, Portugal, and Spain. The force may carry out naval, air and amphibious operations, with an activation time of 5 days after an order is received.

The force was formed in 1995 to fulfill missions defined in the Petersberg Declaration, such as sea control, humanitarian missions, peacekeeping operations, crisis response operations, and peace enforcement.

The EMF is presently not established at the EU level (referred to as the Common Security and Defence Policy, CSDP); it is for instance not a project of the Permanent Structured Cooperation (PESCO) of the CSDP. The EMF may, however, contribute in the implementation of the CSDP when made available as a multinational force in accordance with article 42.3 of the Treaty on European Union (TEU). The force can also be deployed for other international organizations, such as NATO, the United Nations, or the Organization for Security and Co-operation in Europe.

History
19 June 1992: Petersberg Declaration. The concept for forces answerable to the Western European Union is established. 
In June 1992, the Petersberg tasks were set out, defining which potential missions that could be assumed by the Western European Union in the new post-Cold War situation. Consequently, the identification of forces needed to carry out such missions was required.

28 October 1993: Ministers meeting in Grosseto, Italy. The wish to create an international maritime force is stated.  
The following September a ministerial meeting between the governments of Spain, Portugal, France and Italy resolved their willingness to create an international maritime force. This led to the signing of the constitutive document of the European Maritime Force in Lisbon on 15 May 1995. The force came into existence on 2 October 1995, with the appointment of the Spanish Admiral Acedo Manteola (then Alflot) as its first commander.

15 May 1995: Lisbon Conference, signing of the Constitutive Document.

The first activation of the force was made with exercise EOLO 96 in April 1996, In 2001, officers from Greece and Turkey, respectively, integrated as observers in the Permanent Cell, highlighting the willingness of these countries to become full members.

A number of operations and exercises were undertaken in the following years. The first was Operation Coherent Behaviour in the eastern Mediterranean Sea in 2002. During this operation, EMF was in close cooperation with NATO in the frame of Operation Active Endeavor. This was the first autonomous operation in the history of the force, and was carried out based on a mandate given by the participating nations.
  
Upon the completion of this first participation in RWO (Real World Operation), another challenge was taken up by EMF and the force activated to take part in a new RWO. Thus, in 2003, EMF took part in Operation Resolute Behaviour in Indian Ocean in support of an international coalition's Operation Enduring Freedom and gradually embedded into it between 2003 and 2005. The participation of EMF in an operation like this, demonstrated the EMF Nations' cohesion and their commitment to fight together with the international community against terrorism.
 
During this period, by the participation in RWO but also through a demanding program of co-operational exercises with the countries of the south Mediterranean Sea, the visibility and the international recognition of EMF were increased significantly. EMF participated also in Operation UNIFIL between 2008 and 2009, under the aegis of the United Nations. During this activation, the EMF at sea Commander acted as CTF 448. Once again EMF demonstrated  its flexibility and its capability of acting under the aegis of a different organization. This was a historical milestone not only for EMF, but even for the UN, because it was the first UN direct operation.

An activation of EMF, in order to participate in the EU's Operation Atalanta in Indian Ocean, took place in December 2011. This activation lasted for 20 months and ended in August 2013. In December 2013, the force reactivated for participating in the same operation once again.

From its foundation, EMF, has been activated for a total period of 62 months for participation in RWOs.

Structure
The EMF is a non-standing force, and its composition, drawing on participating states' navies, varies depending on the nature of each mission. The size of EMF may range from a small Task Group to a large Task Force including carrier and amphibious groups, escorts and support vessels. Additionally, maritime patrol aircraft, mine countermeasure units, submarines or other types of naval units could be employed, depending on the mission and its related tasks.

From the moment when the member nations take the decision to intervene in a crisis by employing the EMF, the CIMIN directs COMEUROMARFOR to activate the force. After consultation with the CIMIN, CEMF and national authorities, participating nations define the volume and nature of their involvement. Subsequently, they assign units to EMF. COMEUROMARFOR assembles the assigned units and gets their operational control as required.

Commander

High Level Inter-Ministerial Committee
The High Level Inter-Ministerial Committee (CIMIN) is at the top level of EMF organization. The body is composed by Chiefs of Defence (CHOD), Political Head Directorates of Defence and Foreign Affairs Ministries and credited representatives of participating nations. The CIMIN ensures the politico-military direction of the participating countries establishes the conditions for the employment of the force and issues directives to COMEUROMARFOR. CIMIN meetings are convoked when necessary, at the request of any of the member states.

Politico-Military Working Group
The Politico-Military Working Group (POLMIL WG) is the executive body of CIMIN. The POLMIL WG is composed by the representatives from the CHOD's and from the Ministry of Foreign Affairs of the member countries. It takes care of all the activities related to the development and external relations of the Force and ensures the implementation of the CIMIN decisions. The POLMIL WG also appoints a Staff of the EMF countries to act as CIMIN Secretariat, for the conduct of its daily activities and to act as the permanent interlocutor of the CEMF.

Sub working group
Under the POLMIL WG is the EUROMARFOR Sub working group (EMF SWG). EMF SWG is composed by representatives from each one of the Nation's Naval General Staffs mainly to advise the POLMIL WG on specific Naval issues and to express the single National Naval Staff's view on specific issues of own competence and co-ordinate positions and actions to be taken.

Operational level
At the operational level of the chain of command, there is the Commander of the European Maritime Force (CEMF or COMEUROMARFOR), who is designated every two years among the National Naval Authorities (NNAs) entities namely: 
 Commandant de la Force d'action navale (ALFAN) 
 Comandante in Capo della Squadra Navale (CINCNAV) 
 Comandante Naval (COMNAV) 
 Almirante de la Flota (ALFLOT)

The CEMF relies both on his own existing National Staff and the EMF Permanent Cell (EMFPC) for the accomplishment of the assigned duties. The  EMF   is composed by Director  who is an Officer of the same nationality as the CEMF and four representatives (Commanders or Lieutenant Commanders), one from each EMF Nation. Additionally, since November 2001 one Officer from Greece and one from Turkey joined the permanent cell as observers.

Operations
October – 30 November 2002: First activation for an Operation Coherent Behaviour, in the Eastern Mediterranean 
14 January 2003 – 12 December 2005: Second activation for an Operation Resolute Behaviour, in the framework of Operation Enduring Freedom, in the Indian Ocean.
29 February 2008 – 28 February 2009: Third Activation for an Operation: EMF held UNIFIL Maritime Task Force (MTF) command responsibilities in the UN Peacekeeping Operation Impartial Behavior in Lebanon. 12 months of EMF leadership, for the first time under UN aegis.
6 December 2011 – 6 August 2013: Fourth activation for participating in the EU's Operation Atalanta in the Indian Ocean
6 December 2013 – present: Fifth activation for participating yet again in the EU's Operation Atalanta in the Indian Ocean

Exercises
23 April 1996: First activation to participate in the Partners exercise EOLO and for a Port Visit in La Valletta, Malta.
26–30 November 2007: 18th Activation onboard ITS ESPERO in Oran harbour, to participate in Multi-Cooperative Exercise "MCE 07" with the Algerian Navy, off the Oran/Algeria coast. Port visit to Oran. 
23 September 2010 – 27 September 2010: EMF participated in the Exercise MCE 10 with Morocco NW of Casablanca.

Relationship with EU Defence Policy
The EMF is presently not established at the EU level (referred to as the Common Security and Defence Policy, CSDP); it is for instance not a project of the Permanent Structured Cooperation (PESCO) of the CSDP. The EMF may however contribute in the implementation of the CSDP, when made available as a multinational force in accordance with article 42.3 of the Treaty on European Union (TEU).

See also
Common Security and Defence Policy
European Corps
European Gendarmerie Force
European Rapid Operational Force, a related, now-defunct force established by the same four participating states as the EMF
EU Battlegroup

References

External links

 

Military units and formations established in 1995
Naval units and formations
Multinational units and formations